Giovanni Alessandro González Apud (born 20 September 1994) is a Uruguayan professional footballer who plays as a right-back for La Liga club RCD Mallorca and the Uruguay national team.

Club career
González started his career with River Plate Montevideo in 2014. He joined Peñarol in January 2018.

On 29 January 2022, González moved abroad and signed a two-and-a-half-year contract with La Liga side RCD Mallorca.

International career
He received maiden call-up to Uruguay national team in March 2019 for 2019 China Cup. He made his debut on 22 March 2019 in a 3–0 win against Uzbekistan, as a 61st minute substitute for Diego Laxalt.

Personal life
González is the son of former Uruguayan international Juan González.

Career statistics

International

Honours

Club
Peñarol
 Uruguayan Primera División: 2018, 2021
 Supercopa Uruguaya: 2018

References

External links
 Profile at the RCD Mallorca website
 
 

1994 births
Living people
Footballers from Montevideo
Association football defenders
Uruguayan footballers
Uruguay international footballers
Uruguayan Primera División players
La Liga players
Club Atlético River Plate (Montevideo) players
Peñarol players
RCD Mallorca players
2019 Copa América players
Uruguayan expatriate footballers
Uruguayan expatriate sportspeople in Spain
Expatriate footballers in Spain